So Easy by The Choirboys is the 2007 follow up to Big Bad and Acoustic.
Recorded at Main Street Studios by Adam Jordan and mixed by Rob Specogna. The Album features guest vocals from Stevie Wright and Bec Lavelle.

Track listing 
"Sorry"
"She's So Fine"
"St Louis"
"Pretty Girl"
"Women"
"I'll Make You Happy"
"Friday On My Mind"
"Come and See Her"
"So Easy"
"Wedding Ring"
"Too Much"
"For My Woman"
"You Got It Off Me"
"Rock n Roll Boogie"
"Good Times"
"Saturday Night Party"

2007 albums
The Choirboys (band) albums